Marvin Scandrick (born September 25, 1974), better known as Slim, is an American contemporary R&B singer best known as the lead singer/frontman for the group 112. His 2008 debut album Love's Crazy peaked at #32 on the Billboard 200. It included the hit singles "So Fly", which reached #49 on the Billboard Hot 100, and "Good Lovin", which reached #39 on the Hot R&B/Hip-Hop Songs chart.

Discography

Albums
2008: Love's Crazy
2016: Re-Fueled

Singles

References

Living people
21st-century American singers
21st-century African-American male singers
American male singers
American hip hop singers
American contemporary R&B singers
American soul musicians
Asylum Records artists
Musicians from Atlanta
Place of birth missing (living people)
112 (band)
1974 births